Jean-Marie Ulrich N'Nomo N'Gong (born 28 February 1996), commonly known simply as Ulrich N'Nomo, is a professional footballer who plays as a striker for Maltese Maltese Premier League club Valletta. Born in Cameroon, he has represented France at youth level.

References

External links
 
 
 

1996 births
Living people
Footballers from Yaoundé
Association football forwards
Expatriate footballers in Greece
Expatriate footballers in Portugal
Expatriate footballers in England
Expatriate footballers in Malta
French footballers
France youth international footballers
French expatriate footballers
French expatriate sportspeople in Greece
French expatriate sportspeople in Portugal
French expatriate sportspeople in England
French expatriate sportspeople in Malta
Cameroonian expatriate footballers
Cameroonian footballers
Cameroonian expatriate sportspeople in Greece
Cameroonian expatriate sportspeople in Portugal
Cameroonian expatriate sportspeople in England
Cameroonian expatriate sportspeople in Malta
Ligue 2 players
Liga Portugal 2 players
English Football League players
Maltese Premier League players
Football League (Greece) players
Super League Greece 2 players
Championnat National players
LB Châteauroux players
Leyton Orient F.C. players
Gil Vicente F.C. players
Panserraikos F.C. players
Tours FC players
Valletta F.C. players
Levadiakos F.C. players
Apollon Pontou FC players
Cameroonian emigrants to France